Gagarin is a city in Jizzakh Region, Uzbekistan. It is the administrative center of Mirzachoʻl District. The town population was 17,907 people in 1989, and 15,200 in 2016.

References

Populated places in Jizzakh Region
Cities in Uzbekistan